Thaddäus Huber (8 May 1742 – 27 February 1798) was an Austrian violinist and composer.

Life
Huber was born in Niederhollabrunn in Lower Austria; his father was a farmer and amateur violinist. Having musical ability, he joined at age ten the choir of Klosterneuburg Monastery. He later went to Vienna, where he attended the Jesuit seminary and was a member of the boy's choir at the Hofkapelle. He entered Viktring Abbey, where he took over church music. For health reasons he returned to Vienna and, encouraged by his father, he renounced his status as a cleric.

In Vienna he became a violinist in the court theatre. For many years he was a violinist at the Schottenkirche. He was a founder member in 1771 of the Tonkünstler-Societät, and was secretary of the society for several years. In 1789 he became first violin in the Hofkapelle.

His compositions were highly regarded by Joseph Haydn, and his string quartets were played in the afternoon chamber music gatherings of Emperor Joseph II.

Huber died in Vienna in 1798; Gottfried van Swieten bought his musical estate.

Works
Huber's compositions include symphonies, string quartets, divertimenti and  string trios.

References

1742 births
1798 deaths
18th-century composers
Austrian composers
18th-century violinists
Austrian classical violinists